The 1996–97 Croatian Ice Hockey League season was the sixth season of the Croatian Ice Hockey League, the top level of ice hockey in Croatia. Four teams participated in the league, and KHL Medveščak Zagreb won the championship.

Regular season

Playoffs

Semifinals 
 KHL Medveščak Zagreb – INA Sisak 2:0 (37:2, 5:0 Forfeit)
 KHL Zagreb – KHL Mladost Zagreb 2:1 (3:2, 2:4, 6:4)

Final 
 KHL Medveščak Zagreb – KHL Zagreb 3:0 (7:0, 4:2, 3:2)

Croatian Ice Hockey League
1
Croatian Ice Hockey League seasons